Nepenthes leyte is a tropical pitcher plant native to the Philippines. It appears to be endemic to the island of Leyte, after which it is named. It has been recorded from submontane mossy forest at 900 m altitude.

This species belongs to the informal "N. alata group", which also includes N. alata, N. ceciliae, N. copelandii, N. extincta, N. graciliflora, N. hamiguitanensis, N. kitanglad, N. kurata, N. mindanaoensis, N. negros, N. ramos, N. saranganiensis, and N. ultra. These species are united by a number of morphological characters, including winged petioles, lids with basal ridges on the lower surface (often elaborated into appendages), and upper pitchers that are usually broadest near the base.

It has been suggested that N. leyte might fall within the natural variability of N. ramos, though field studies would be needed to confirm this.

References

 Smith, L. (2014). Pitcher perfect - but carnivorous plants are at risk. The Independent, January 5, 2014. 

Carnivorous plants of Asia
leyte
Endemic flora of the Philippines
Flora of the Visayas
Critically endangered flora of Asia
Plants described in 2013
Taxa named by Martin Cheek
Taxa named by Matthew Jebb